Hornet's Nest is a 1923 British silent drama film directed by Walter West and starring Florence Turner, Fred Wright, and Nora Swinburne.

Cast

References

Bibliography
 Low, Rachael. The History of the British Film 1918-1929. George Allen & Unwin, 1971.

External links
 

1923 films
1923 drama films
British drama films
British silent feature films
Films directed by Walter West
Films set in England
British black-and-white films
Films based on British novels
1920s English-language films
1920s British films
Silent drama films